Aquilaria banaensae is a species of plant in the Thymelaeaceae family. It is endemic to Vietnam.

References

Endemic flora of Vietnam
banaensae
Vulnerable plants
Taxonomy articles created by Polbot
Taxobox binomials not recognized by IUCN